Georgios T. Halkias (born June 6, 1967) is a Greek scholar of Oriental Studies with publications on Tibetan Buddhism, Himalayan regions, and cross-cultural contacts between Hellenism and Buddhism. He is currently an associate professor of Buddhist Studies at the University of Hong Kong. and co-editor in chief of the Oxford Encyclopedia of Buddhism

Education
Halkias was born in Athens, Greece, and studied for his B.A. and M.A. in Western and Asian philosophy at the University of Hawai'i at Manoa. He received in 2006 his DPhil in Oriental studies at the Faculty of Oriental Studies, Oxford, where he is currently a visiting associate researcher.

Books and edited volumes
 Luminous Bliss: A Religious History of Pure Land Literature in Tibet. With an Annotated Translation and Critical Analysis of the Orgyen-ling golden short Sukhāvatīvyūha-sūtra. University of Hawai‘i Press, 2013. Paperback edition 2017.
 Religious Boundaries for Sex, Gender, and Corporeality. Routledge Religion Series, 2018. 
 Pure Lands in Asian Texts and Contexts: An Anthology. University of Hawaii Press, 2019. 
 Contemporary Visions in Tibetan Studies: Proceedings of the First International Seminar of Young Tibetologists SOAS, London 2007. Serindia Press, 2007.

Selected publications
 “Śrī Siṃha’s Final Upadeśa: Seven Nails that Strike the Essence of Awakening.” In Illuminating the Dharma: Buddhist Studies in Honour of Venerable Professor KL Dhammajoti, ed. Toshiichi Endo. Centre of Buddhist Studies, The University of Hong Kong, 181-194, 2021.
 “Yavanayāna: Scepticism as Soteriology in Aristocle’s Passage.” In Buddhism and Skepticism: Historical, Philosophical, and Comparative Perspectives, ed. Oren Hanner. Hamburg Buddhist Studies Series 13, University of Hamburg, 83-108, 2020. 
 “The Heritage Buddhist Manuscripts of Ladakh: Tibetan Buddhist Canons and the Perfection of Wisdom Sūtras.” Himalaya Journal, Vol 39, No. 2, 1–9, 2019.
 “Buddhist Meditation in Tibet: Exoteric and Esoteric Orientations.” In Oxford Handbook of Meditation, eds. Miguel Farias, et al. Oxford University Press, 1–27, 2019.
 “Heavenly Ascents after Death: Karma Chagme’s Commentary on Mind Transference.” Revue d’Etudes Tibétaines, no. 52, 70–89, 2019.
 “Great Journeys in Little Spaces: Buddhist Matters in Khyentse Norbu’s Travellers and Magicians.” International Journal of Buddhist Thought and Culture, Vol. 28. No. 2, 205–223, 2018. 
 “A History Worth Remembering: An Expedition to the Fortress of Basgo.” Orientations, Vol. 48, No. 2, 150–155, 2017.
 “The Mirror and the Palimpsest: The Myth of Buddhist Kingship in Imperial Tibet.” In Locating Religions: Contact, Diversity and Translocality, eds. Reinhold F. Glei and Nikolas Jaspert. Brill, 123–150, 2017.
 “The Self-immolation of Kalanos and other Luminous Encounters among Greeks and Indian Buddhists in the Hellenistic world.” Journal of the Oxford Centre for Buddhist Studies, Vol. VIII, 163–186, 2015.
 “Fire Rituals in the Tibetan Tengyur: The Aparimitāyur-homa-vidhi-nāma by the Queen of Siddhas.” In Homa Variations: The Study of Ritual Change across the Longue Durée, eds. R. Payne and M. Witzel. Oxford University Press, 225–245, 2015.
 “When the Greeks Converted the Buddha: Asymmetrical Transfers of Knowledge in Indo-Greek Cultures.” In Religions and Trade: Religious Formation, Transformation and Cross-Cultural Exchange between East and West, ed. Volker Rabens. Brill, 65–115, 2013. 
 “The Enlightened Sovereign: Kingship and Buddhism in Indo-Tibetan Traditions.” In A Companion to Buddhist Philosophy, ed. Steven Emmanuel. John Wiley & Sons, 491–511, 2013.
 “The Muslim Queens of the Himalayas: Princess Exchange in Ladakh and Baltistan.” In Islam-Tibet: Interactions along the Musk Routes, eds. Anna Akasoy et al. Ashgate Publications, 231–252, 2010.
 “Until the Feathers of the Winged Black Raven Turn White: Sources for the Tibet-Bashahr Treaty of 1679–1684.” In Mountains, Monasteries and Mosques: Recent Research on Ladakh and the Western Himalaya, eds. John Bray et al. Supplement to Rivista Degli Studi Orientali, Nuova Serie, Volume LXXX, 61–86, 2009.
 “Pure-Lands and other Visions in Seventeenth-Century Tibet: a Gnam-chos sādhana for the pure-land Sukhāvatī revealed in 1658 by Gnam-chos Mi-’gyur-rdo-rje (1645–1667).” In Power, Politics and the Reinvention of Tradition: Tibet in the Seventeenth and Eighteenth Century, eds. Brian Cuevas et al. Brill, 121–151, 2006.
 “Tibetan Buddhism Registered: Imperial Archives from the Palace-Temple of ’Phang-thang.” The Eastern Buddhist, Kyoto. Vol. XXXVI, Nos. 1 and 2, 46–105, 2004.

References

External links
 Georgios T . Halkias | The University of Hong Kong - Academia.edu
 Heavenly Ascents After Death: Karma Chags meds “Commentary on Mind Transference” by Georgios T. Halkias

1967 births
Living people
Tibetologists
University of Hawaiʻi at Mānoa alumni